Simple Men is a 1992 American film written and directed by Hal Hartley and starring Robert John Burke, Bill Sage, Karen Sillas, and Martin Donovan. It was the debut film of actress Holly Marie Combs, in a supporting role. It was entered into the 1992 Cannes Film Festival.

Plot
Brothers Bill and Dennis reunite after their anarchist father escapes from the hospital.

Bill is angry after being double-crossed after a robbery by his girlfriend, and he promises to break the heart of the next woman he meets, while Dennis is fresh out of college and somewhat naive about the world. Dennis is set on finding their father, and Bill is broke, so they set off to find him.

Their motorcycle breaks down near a diner in the middle of nowhere, where they meet the beautiful Kate, mysterious Elina, and short-tempered Martin. They decide to stay for a few days and gradually become entangled in local life.

Cast
 Robert John Burke - Bill McCabe (as Robert Burke)
 Bill Sage - Dennis McCabe
 Karen Sillas - Kate
 Elina Löwensohn - Elina
 Martin Donovan - Martin
 Mark Chandler Bailey - Mike (as Mark Bailey)
 Chris Cooke - Vic
 Jeffrey Howard - Ned Rifle
 Holly Marie Combs - Kim
 Joe Stevens - Jack
 Damian Young - Sheriff
 Marietta Marich - Mom (Meg)
 John MacKay - Dad
 Bethany Wright - Mary
 Richard Reyes - Security Guard
 Margaret Bowman - Nurse Louise

Music
Simple Men features the song "Kool Thing" by the American alternative rock band Sonic Youth.

A portion of dialogue from the film can be heard in the song Paradise off the hip-hop album E&A by Eyedea and Abilities.

References

External links
 
 

1992 films
1992 comedy-drama films
American comedy-drama films
Films directed by Hal Hartley
American avant-garde and experimental films
Films set in Houston
Films shot in Houston
1990s avant-garde and experimental films
1990s English-language films
1990s American films